Effacement may refer to:

Histology
Effacement (histology), the shortening, or thinning, of a tissue.
Cervical effacement, the thinning of the cervix.

Paleontology
Effacement, an evolutionary trend resulting in the loss of surface detail in trilobites.